Beycik is a village of Kemer District, Antalya Province, Turkey. It is located southwest of Antalya. The population is 326, as of 2000.

Beycik is situated in the Olympos National Park, in the foothills of Mount Olympos (2,400 m) and at an altitude of 450 m to 1,000 m. Noteworthy tourist attractions in the vicinity are Phaselis and Tekirova. The distance to the city of Antalya is 65 km and to the tourist town of Kemer is 22 km.

External links
 http://www.beycik.de

Antalya
Towns in Turkey
Turkish Riviera
Villages in Kemer District